The National Center for Science Education (NCSE) is a not-for-profit membership organization in the United States whose stated mission is to educate the press and the public on the scientific and educational aspects of controversies surrounding the teaching of evolution and climate change, and to provide information and resources to schools, parents, and other citizens working to keep those topics in public school science education. Based in Oakland, California, it claims 4,500 members that include scientists, teachers, clergy, and citizens of varied religious and political affiliations. The Center opposes the teaching of religious views in science classes in America's public schools; it does this through initiatives such as Project Steve. The Center has been called the United States' "leading anti-creationist organization". The Center is affiliated with the American Association for the Advancement of Science.

NCSE is currently a member of the National Coalition Against Censorship.

History
In 1980 Stanley L. Weinberg, a veteran high-school teacher in Iowa, began to organize statewide Committees of Correspondence "committed to the defense of education in evolutionary theory," modelled upon the committees of correspondence in pre-Revolutionary America. Their purpose was to keep interested parties informed about creationist endeavours and to share ideas for responses, allowing a political response at a local level. This grew into volunteer networks in most states, with the Creation/Evolution Newsletter interconnecting them, which was incorporated as the NCSE in 1983. In 1987, author and lecturer Eugenie Scott, who holds a PhD in Physical Anthropology, became its executive director. The Board of Directors and official supporters, as explained by NCSE, "reflects our scientific roots."

In the 1990s, based upon its monitoring of creationist efforts, it issued warnings of high levels of official anti-evolutionism and a "sharp surge upwards" in creationist attacks on evolution, including attempts to downgrade evolution from "fact" to "theory" (see evolution as theory and fact) or present the "evidence against evolution" (see objections to evolution).

The organization's supporters include Bruce Alberts, former President of the National Academy of Sciences; Donald Johanson, discoverer of the "Lucy" fossil; and evolutionary biologist Francisco J. Ayala. Also the late paleontologist and writer Stephen Jay Gould was a long-time supporter. As of 2012, the group has 4500 members who are "scientists, teachers, clergy, and citizens with diverse religious and political affiliations."

In November 2013 Ann Reid succeeded Eugenie C. Scott as executive director. Eugenie C. Scott served as executive director for 27 years, 1986 to 2013.

Activities and programs 
The NCSE maintains up-to-date listings of current events and information regarding creationist and antievolution advocacy, as well as about evolution education. Historian of science Michael Shermer describes its website as being one of "the two best resources on the Internet on the evolution/creation topic" (the other being TalkOrigins Archive). The NCSE also opposes intelligent design and other "alternatives" to evolution because it says they are misleading euphemisms for creationism.

NCSE "is religiously neutral, though it cooperates nationally and locally with religious organizations, as well as scientific and educational organizations like the National Academy of Sciences, the National Association of Biology Teachers, and the National Science Teachers Association." Its willingness to engage positively with, and avoid taking sides against, religiously minded supporters of evolution has been noted by historian of creationism Ronald L. Numbers and atheist author Richard Dawkins.

The NCSE offers a variety of lecturers, including biologists, anthropologists, philosophers, and theologians, for topics relating to evolution, science, and education. Also it hosts activities including trips and conferences. It publishes Reports of the National Center for Science Education bimonthly, containing peer-reviewed articles, book reviews, and news. From 1980 to 1997, it published the Creation/Evolution Journal, which has since been merged into Reports of the National Center for Science Education. Additionally, it publishes books, such as a compilation of scientific analyses of creationist books.

In 2003, the NCSE gained international attention with Project Steve.

In 2005, the NCSE assisted the plaintiffs in Kitzmiller v. Dover Area School District, the most prominent case testing the constitutionality of intelligent design in public school science classes, and put their extensive library of creationist materials at the plaintiffs' disposal. Nick Matzke, the NCSE's Public Information Project Director at the time, served as liaison to the legal team, and was responsible for uncovering the substitution of "intelligent design" for "creationism" within drafts of Of Pandas and People, which became a devastating part of the testimony of Barbara Forrest (also an NCSE Director), and was cited extensively in Judge John E. Jones III's decision.

In April 2008, the NCSE launched Expelled Exposed, a website critical of the alleged documentary Expelled: No Intelligence Allowed starring Ben Stein. The website received press attention and a large amount of traffic.

In 2012, the NCSE announced they would be engaged in efforts to keep climate change education, and global warming issues, safe from threats from special interests. They have developed a series of lessons addressing climate change misconceptions and offer teacher training through a Teacher Ambassador program.

Media
Eugenie Scott appeared on Uncommon Knowledge, as NCSE spokesperson, twice in 2001 debating intelligent design creationist William A. Dembski. Then in 2004, NCSE was represented by Scott on Penn and Teller's Showtime television show Bullshit! on the episode "Creationism". Scott offered scientific views about the creationist and intelligent design movements. She noted, "it would be unfair to tell students that there is a serious dispute going on among scientists whether evolution took place. There's not." She further noted that "a lot of the time the creationists ... they'll search through scientific journals and try to pull out something they think demonstrates evolution doesn't work and there is a kind of interesting rationale behind it. Their theology is such that if one thing is wrong with the Bible you have to throw it all out so that's why Genesis has to be interpreted literally. They look at science the same way. If one little piece of the evolutionary puzzle doesn't fit the whole thing has to go." Scott then explained "that's not the way science is done."

In November 2007 Scott discussed the NCSE's exploration of intelligent design on the NOVA documentary Judgment Day: Intelligent Design on Trial, which documented Kitzmiller v. Dover Area School District.

Staff and supporters

Staff
 Executive Director: Ann Reid
 Deputy Director: Glenn Branch
 Director of Community Science Education: Kate Carter
 Director of Teacher Support: Lin Andrews
 Program Coordinator: Emma Doctors
 IT Specialist: Stuart Fogg
 Member Relations Manager: Nina Hollenberg
 Director of Operations: Rae Holzman
 Director of Development: Deb Janes
 Editor, Reports of the NCSE: Paul Oh
 Director of Communications: Paul Oh

Officers and Directors 
 Kenneth R. Miller, President
 Lorne Trottier, Vice President 
 Michael Haas, Treasurer 
 Vicki Chandler
 Sarah B. George
 Michael B. Lubic
 Michael Mann 
 Naomi Oreskes
 Barry Polisky
 Benjamin D. Santer

See also
Anti-evolution
Climate change denial
Creation and evolution in public education in the United States
Creationism
Education in the United States
Environmental groups and resources serving K–12 schools
Evolution
Fundamentalist–Modernist controversy#Background: Darwinism and Christianity
Intelligent design
Intelligent design movement
National Council for Science and the Environment, an unrelated non-profit business-research alliance on environmental policy
Teach the Controversy
Wedge strategy

Notes

References

External links
 
 Expelled-Exposed
 Creation/Evolution journal online 1980-1996 (full run)

Climate change organizations based in the United States
Science advocacy organizations
Scientific organizations based in the United States
Scientific organizations established in 1983
Educational charities based in the United States
Educational organizations based in the United States
Nonpartisan organizations in the United States
501(c)(3) organizations
Charities based in California
Non-profit organizations based in California
Science and technology in the San Francisco Bay Area
Organizations based in Oakland, California
1983 establishments in the United States
Organizations established in 1983